Bumblebee is a fictional robot character appearing in the many continuities in the Transformers franchise. The character is a member of the Autobots, a group of sentient, self-configuring, modular extraterrestrial robotic lifeforms.

In the original line of toys and in the animated series, Bumblebee is a small yellow Volkswagen Beetle. In the live action movies, he has appeared as vehicles inspired by the Chevrolet American muscle cars – with the live-action film versions being a yellow Camaro with black racing stripes. The original vehicle-mode design was based on a classic European Type 1 Volkswagen Beetle. The character is named after the bumblebee, a black-and-yellow striped insect which inspired his paint scheme. Bumblebee is a fan-favorite character and he appears in most of the series and later becomes the main protagonist in Transformers: Robots in Disguise, Bumblebee, and Transformers: Cyberverse. Bumblebee has also taken the form of a 1977 second generation Camaro, later appearing as fifth generation Camaro in the 2018 film, Bumblebee.

Transformers: Generation 1
Bumblebee (known as Abejorro in Mexico, Bumble in Japan, Moscardo in Portugal, Űrdongó in Hungary, Maggiolino in Italy) is the "little brother" of the heroic Autobots and a mascot, constantly striving to prove himself in the eyes of the other robots—especially his leader, Optimus Prime. This often causes him to take risks and put himself in danger. He is portrayed as a smart aleck, a capable, reliable messenger and spy, and his small size allows him to go places that his larger commanders cannot. He is highly fuel-efficient, has great visual acuity, is particularly adaptable to undersea environments, and transforms into a Saturn yellow Volkswagen Beetle. He was later reconstructed into a stronger, more mature form as Goldbug.

Reception
At BotCon 2010, Hasbro named Bumblebee as one of the first five robot inductees in the Transformers Hall of Fame.

Animated series

The Transformers
Bumblebee is the second character to appear in the original Transformers animated series, while on a mission to recover a small clutch of energy conductors with Wheeljack. Bumblebee was among the Transformers aboard the Ark when it crash landed on Earth, causing the Transformers within to be trapped in stasis for 4 million years. Upon awakening in 1984, Bumblebee helps Ironhide quell a raging river and uses his small size to help the human ally, Sparkplug Witwicky plant explosives in the midst of a Decepticon mining operation.

Bumblebee later befriends Sparkplug's son, Spike, but on their first adventure together they are both kidnapped by the Decepticons and Bumblebee's memory chip is altered to make him lure the other Autobots into a trap. Bumblebee recovers in time to help his fellow Autobots stop the Decepticons from sending Spike to Cybertron. After their first adventure, Bumblebee and Spike become best friends as they realize they make a good team.

On one of their missions, Bumblebee and Spike are injured in a Decepticon attack on a rocket base. Bumblebee is repaired by Ratchet, and Spike is fixed at the hospital, but Spike's mind is transferred into the robot body of Autobot X, created by Sparkplug, so the doctors at the hospital can operate on his real one. Spike leaves the base due to a side effect of the mind transfer. Bumblebee then leaves to search for him, however his radio transmitters were not fixed yet. Bumblebee finds spike and tries to convince him to return, but Spike believes that he is being tricked. Bumblebee sees the Decepticons arriving at their location and overhears Megatron telling lies to Spike. Bumblebee then leaves to go get support from other Autobots, who are helping repair at the rocket base. After arriving at the rocket base, Bumblebee tells Optimus Prime that Megatron is manipulating Spike. Optimus decides to help Bumblebee, fearing that due to Spike's compromised mental state he could be taken advantage of by the Decepticons. Bumblebee and Optimus reach Spike and attempt to communicate with him, but they are unable to do so. Eventually they are able to break through to Spike just in time to help Sparkplug, who was in danger. After the Decepticons leave, Bumblebee and Spike high-five.

Bumblebee's next adventure would occur when he accompanied Spike and Sparkplug with Jazz to test out his new speakers but decided to head to headquarters so they wouldn't have to deal with his loud music. When Bumblebee returned to the headquarters, he saw nobody but Bluestreak there and that Teletraan One was damaged. He then was dragged to the recharging chamber by Bluestreak, due to Megatron putting a personality destabilizer in their recharging chamber to turn all the Autobots evil. However, Bumblebee was saved when Jazz, Spike and Sparkplug arrived back just in time as Jazz knocked Bluestreak out for a while. After Sparkplug fixed Teletraan One, he, Bumblebee, Jazz and Spike learn about what happened. With Bumblebee and Jazz being the only ones who were not affected from the personality destabilizer, Bumblebee decided to stop his comrades when he hears about Optimus Prime, Brawn and Prowl attacking an Air Force jet base with Spike accompanying him. Once they arrived, Bumblebee tried a few times to get through to Optimus but to no success. Bumblebee was relieved that his friends were free from the Decepticons' control, after Sparkplug invented Attitude exchanger to counteract the personality destabilizer effects, except for Prime. Bumblebee took the last one, as there was no other ones left, as he wanted to make one final attempted to get Optimus back to his senses. Bumblebee tells Prime that he is not evil, and he believes in him, then encourages him to fight off Megatron's control also to not give in. Bumblebee quickly put the Attitude exchanger on Optimus, who heard his voice, which freed him from Decepticon control. Bumblebee was given a hug by Prime for not giving up on him and for saving him. After stopping the Decepticons, Bumblebee was thanked again by Optimus Prime, who also thanked everyone for their help, for what he did for him. Bumblebee with Spike gave Ratchet and Sparkplug tools as they needed to fix the Air Force jets the Autobots destroyed while under Megatron's control.

Bumblebee later befriended a girl named Carly, who admired the Autobots. While testing out one of Wheeljack's inventions, Bumblebee fought the Decepticons as they wanted to steal it which they succeed in doing. After the battle, Bumblebee and Spike went looking for Carly, who left base to help them as she believed it was her fault that the Decepticons got the invention because of her due to being there when they were testing it. Bumblebee and Spike found Carly with Ironhide, who was the one who rescued her from the Decepticons, then left but they didn't get very far when they saw that their friend wasn't behind them. Transforming back into robot mode, Bumblebee wondering what was going on then saw that Ironhide was immobilized. After the rest of the Autobots showed up, Bumblebee, along with Spike and Carly hid, and all agreed that they had to do something. Bumblebee signaled Jazz to do his sound and light show which distracted the Decepticons so Carly can reverse the process of Wheeljack's invention. After the battle is won, Bumblebee encourages Spike to ask Carly out knowing that they have feelings for each other.

By 2005, the Decepticons had conquered Cybertron, forcing Bumblebee and Spike to operate on Moonbase Two, one of Cybertron's moons. When the planet-eating Transformer Unicron began devouring the moons, Bumblebee and Spike set their moon to self-destruct and attempted to escape in their shuttle, but to no avail. Spike's son Daniel later rescues Bumblebee, Spike, Jazz and Cliffjumper from being cast into a smelting pit inside Unicron's digestive system. Bumblebee and the others then escape before Unicron explodes due to the power of Matrix of Leadership.

When the body of the deceased Optimus Prime is recovered from space by a pair of Transformer-hating human scientists who intend to use it to lure the Autobots into a trap, Bumblebee is part of the rescue team led by Rodimus Prime to recover it. Entering the lab, some of the Transformers are exposed to rage-inducing alien spores that could infect them with the Hate Plague, which causes them to run wild. Although Bumblebee avoids infection, he is seriously damaged by the infected rampaging Superion. A member of the alien race called the Quintessons subsequently repair and restore Optimus Prime to life, so he can stop the Hate Plague and repair Bumblebee. The little Autobot was so severely damaged that he required an entire reconstruction and is rebuilt as a Throttlebot. In his new, shiny body, he comments that he has gone beyond just being plain old Bumblebee, and is now a "gold bug", prompting Optimus Prime to redub him Goldbug. Goldbug travels with Optimus Prime to the Decepticon planet of Chaar in order to secure a heat-resistant alloy that can protect him from the plague, only to be infected on the mission and later cured when Prime uses the power of the Matrix of Leadership to purge the plague. Because of an animation error, Bumblebee appears in a wide shot in a celebration with Goldbug where he was seen jumping and cheering during the series' final episode.

Bumblebee and Optimus Prime are the only Autobots to appear all of the seasons, especially the first and final episode of the cartoon. Bumblebee appears in the final episode as an animation error, but it counts that he is a major character who appeared. Bumblebee reappears in Generation 2: Redux, a Botcon magazine which is set after the events of the final episode as Goldbug battling the Decepticons in Switzerland along with Jazz, Sideswipe, Beachcomber and Seaspray and became Bumblebee once again in his G2 color by the power of Forestonite.

Transformers: The Headmasters
In Transformers: The Headmasters, Goldbug and the other Throttlebots were on Cybertron when Vector Sigma began to destabilize as a consequence of Optimus Prime releasing the Matrix's energy to cure the Hate Plague the previous year. The Decepticons soon invaded the planet in an attempt to take control of the computer, and Goldbug and the Throttlebots joined Dinobots Grimlock and Slag in holding the line against them. Unfortunately, they were knocked unconscious by the hypnotic power of the new Decepticon Headmaster Mindwipe, but they had managed to delay the Decepticons long enough for the Autobot Headmasters to arrive and take up the fight.

The Throttlebots disappeared after this encounter, suggesting they might have been destroyed, but they eventually resurfaced months later as the Decepticons were carrying out their final plan to destroy the Earth. Goldbug and the Throttlebots teamed up with Fastlane and Cloudraker to investigate the emergence of a "Death Tower" in Santiago, Chile, only to find Predaking there waiting for them. Naturally, the small 'bots were no match for the powerful combiner, but they fought bravely, clinging onto his limbs before being hurled aside. Luckily, the Autobot Targetmasters arrived in time to bail them out and take Predaking down. This is also because of the budget cut that happened in the middle of the movie.

Books

Ballantine Books
Bumblebee was featured in the 1985 Find Your Fate Junior books Dinobots Strike Back by Casey Todd and Battle Drive by Barbara Siegel and Scott Siegel.

Kid Stuff Records & Tapes
Bumblebee was featured in the 1985 audio and book adventure Satellite of Doom publishing by Kid Stuff Records & Tapes.

Modern Publishing
Bumblebee was featured in the 1993 Transformers: Generation 2 coloring book Decepticon Madness by Bud Simpson.

Comics
Bumblebee has appeared in numerous comic books and related media printed by various publishers.

3H Enterprises 
Bumblebee appeared in the voice actor play performed at BotCon 2004, in which a device built by Rhinox to stop Unicron from pulling victims from other dimensions inadvertently transports an Autobot shuttle under Bumblebee's command into the middle of a battle between Rattrap, Silverbolt, and Waspinator and a team of Unicron's agents. Bumblebee's shuttle is able to scoop up Rattrap and company when their ship is destroyed. After saving more of Unicron's victims from the Decepticons, Bumblebee's team returns to their own time.

Condor Verlag
In a story called "By their Blasters you shall know them ...!" from Transformers Comic-Magazin issue #12 by German comic publisher Condor Verlag Optimus Prime instructs Backstreet, Bumblebee and Ruckus on how to identify Autobots from Decepticons in battle using the Ark's computer. Pretender Bumblebee is one of those he displays to the Autobots.

Devil's Due Publishing 
In Devil's Due's first G.I. Joe vs. The Transformers crossover, the evil terrorist organization Cobra are the first to uncover the Ark and the Transformers slumbering within it, capturing and reformatting a large number of them to use them as war machines. Bumblebee and Wheeljack are able to avoid this fate, contact the team created to respond to the threat of Cobra, G.I. Joe, and help to free their fellow Autobots. Unlike most Autobots, who had new alternate modes, Bumblebee and Wheeljack had their original Generation 1 alternate modes in this series.

In the second crossover, Bumblebee is among the Autobots sent back in time due to an accident with the spacebridge computer Teletran-3. As part of a small group transported to the 1970s, Bumblebee is reformatted as a small economy car (this time, resembling an AMC Pacer) before the teamed-up Joes and Cobras return all the Transformers to present-day Cybertron.

Bumblebee takes center stage in the third crossover series, as he, Grimlock, Arcee, and Perceptor are sent to Earth to aid G.I. Joe in removing the influence of Cybertronian technology on the planet. Sporting his original alternate mode again, he is shown to have something of a crush on Arcee. When Cobra attacks the base, the Autobots help repel the Cobra Battle Android Trooper armies. Journeying to Cybertron to stop Serpentor, the mismatched group is ambushed first by Cannibalizers, then by Serpentor, Piranacon, Predaking and the Stunticons, with Bumblebee being badly injured as he runs right into Predaking's leg. He is then executed by Serpentor, who would later comment that Bumblebee's death is the only thing that ever really made him feel emotion. Despite the character being notoriously difficult to kill, it seems his death is permanent, as Serpentor comments that he felt something leave him, most likely his spark. A statue to his memory was seen in the final issue. His death would continue to have repercussions, as seen in the fourth series, in which Prime insists on journeying to Earth personally rather than expose any of his troops to the same fate.

Dreamwave Productions 
When Dreamwave Productions introduced their re-imagined version of Generation 1 continuity for the 21st Century, Bumblebee was present for the Autobots' new adventures once again. The War Within, set in Cybertron's past, chronicled Bumblebee's early adventures in the Battle of Altihex and the defense of Iacon in the face of an attack by Shockwave.

When Optimus Prime and Megatron vanish in an early spacebridge experiment, causing the Autobots and Decepticons to splinter into smaller factions, Bumblebee remains with the Autobots under Prowl's command.

As usual, Bumblebee is among the Transformers trapped in stasis aboard the crashed Ark who are reactivated on Earth in 1984. Although not depicted in fiction, the general events of the television series pilot seemed to take place in the Dreamwave continuity - with Bumblebee meeting and befriending Spike Witwicky.

Fun Publications 
Classic Bumblebee was featured on the cover of Transformers Club Magazine #14.

In a possible future chronicled in the exclusive comic book available at BotCon 2005, Bumblebee featured as the espionage director of the Autobots. Having been on the trail of the Decepticon agent Flamewar for a long time, Bumblebee interrupts a communication between Flamewar and the Tripredacus Council and reveals that his agent, Ricochet, has installed a degenerative virus into Deathsaurus's clone army. With Flamewar now exposed, Bumblebee points out that she was nothing more than a liability to the council, who blow her ship up.

Based on the Transformers Classics toy line, the Timelines 2007 story is set 15 years after the end of the Marvel Comics story (ignoring all events of the Marvel UK and Generation 2 comics). Megatron has survived the crash of the Ark on Earth, reformatted himself into a new form, and now leads Ramjet, Skywarp, Soundwave, Starscream, and the Constructicons. Optimus Prime has also returned to Earth commanding Bumblebee, Cliffjumper, Grimlock, Jetfire, Mirage, and Rodimus (formerly Hot Rod).

In Crossing Over, when the Cybertronians Skyfall and Landquake arrive on Earth unexpectedly Megatron attempts to destroy them, but Optimus Prime and his Autobots are able to drive Megatron away.

Bumblebee appears in the story Generation 2: Redux in which he is among the reinforcements from Autobot City to respond to the Decepticon attack at the Large Hadron Collider in Switzerland. Once there, the Autobots are able to defeat the Decepticons, but during the fight the Autobots are exposed to refined Forestonite, which enhances and mutates Cybertronian systems. He gets enhanced to his Generation 2 form.

IDW Publishing 
Fall of 2005 was the third re-launch for the Transformers comic series, this time under the management of IDW Publishing.

IDW's core universe was introduced with the six-issue mini-series, The Transformers: Infiltration, making it clear that the company's take on the Generation 1 universe was radically different. Bumblebee appears as a member of a small team of Autobots under the command of Prowl, operating in secret on Earth out of Ark-19. Still a Volkswagen Beetle, he (like the other Autobots) possesses the added ability to generate a "holo-matter" avatar of a young female to masquerade as a driver and to otherwise interact with humans. Working with Ratchet and a trio of young humans to search an abandoned Decepticon base, Bumblebee is able to take down Skywarp during a Decepticon attack, out-thinking the Decepticon and shooting him out of the sky despite his teleportation system. After Blitzwing and Skywarp bring the base down, Bumblebee helps save the humans, despite commenting previously that they would be acceptable losses. As Megatron then engages the traitorous Starscream in battle, Bumblebee does what he does best by spying on the fight; almost shot by the Battlechargers, he is saved by Prowl and Jazz. In the follow-up, The Transformers: Escalation, he is left to run the Ark-19 on his own.

Bumblebee was among the Autobots who opposed the Decepticons serving the elder gods in the IDW Publishing Infestation 2: Transformers comic.

TFcon comics
Bumblebee, voiced by Dan Gilvezan, appeared in the TFcon 2009 voice actor play Bee for, Bee now.

Bumblebee appears among the characters in Re-Unification, the 2010 TFCon voice actor play prelude comic.

Games
Bumblebee was one of eight playable characters in the 1986 Commodore 64 video game Transformers: The Battle to Save the Earth.

The Classic toy line appeared in a simple Flash-based video game on the Hasbro web site called Transformers Battle Circuit. In this one-on-one fighting game, players press the right and left arrow keys to try to overpower their opponent. Playable characters include Rodimus, Bumblebee, Grimlock, Jetfire, Starscream, Astrotrain, Trypticon, and Menasor. Optimus Prime and Megatron each appear as the boss the player must defeat to win the game.

Bumblebee appears in the 2003 video game Transformers, voiced by Jack Merluzzi.

Bumblebee is one of the light-blue robots in the 2010 card game Monopoly Deal Transformers.

Other merchandise
Popular Bumblebee-specific merchandise includes shirts and costumes based on the character.

Other media
A parody of the Generation 1 Transformers was aired in the December 23, 2008, episode of Frank TV, called "Frank the Halls". In the story, Optimus Prime and his Autobots (Bumblebee, Jazz, and Wheeljack) battle Megatron and his Decepticons (Soundwave and Starscream) when Optimus runs out of gas. Optimus becomes enraged at the price of gas, steals the fuel from the annoying hybrid Autobot Prius Maximus, then joins the Decepticons in destroying the city.

Bumblebee appears in the Robot Chicken episode "Junk in the Trunk". In the segment he is in, he is whipped by a towel used by Grimlock in the locker room and later appears at Optimus's bedside before he dies of prostate cancer.

Maggie Simpson appeared as Bumblebee in one episode's opening sequence to The Simpsons alongside the rest of the Simpson family rendered as Autobots.

Transformers: Generation 2

Bumblebee is a clone of the original Bumblebee.

Fun Publications
In "Flash Forward, Part 3", Jhiaxus, seeking to create a new unified faction of Transformers, "borrowed" personality components, forestonite, Hi-Q, and blueprints from Quantum Laboratories. One of these Transformers was a clone of Bumblebee. Bumblebee, along with the other clones, were introduced to Pyro as a second generation of Transformers. In "Flash Forward, Part 5", Bumblebee and Mirage greeted a clone of Sideswipe, unaware the clone was actually the original Sideswipe. In A Flash Forward, Part 6, Bumblebee, Mirage, and Ironhide confronted the escaping Autobots, but Pyro convinced them to return to Earth with him.

Toys
Generation 2 Go-Bot Bumblebee (1995)

A redeco of Go-Bot High Beam, transforming into a yellow sports car. He features through-axle construction for incredibly fast zipping on flat, smooth surfaces, and is compatible with many tracks and playsets from Hot Wheels and Matchbox. This figure was later repurposed as the second-generation Bumblebee. This mold was also used to make Robots in Disguise (2001) Crosswise and Nightracer.

Transformers: Armada
Bumblebee is the Japanese name of Perceptor in Transformers: Armada. The Mini-Con Sparkplug was also based on the original Bumblebee, while Hot Shot was in fact going to be named Bumblebee but had his name changed due to trademark reasons.

Toys
Super Collection Figure Bumble (2003)
A PVC figurine was made for Perceptor/Bumble, part of the tenth act of Super Collection Figures made by Takara. There are two versions: one in cartoon colors and one in a silver color scheme.

Transformers: Energon

Bumblebee is a member of Rodimus's crew from Transformers: Energon. He appears only in a flashback and looks exactly like his Generation 1 counterpart. Bumblebee was originally supposed to be one of the main characters of the "Unicron Trilogy" but was replaced by Hot Shot.

Animated Series
Led by Rodimus, the crew left Cybertron 8,000 years ago and created a new home world on the planet Omnitron.

Transformers (film series)

Bumblebee appears as one of the main Autobot characters in the live-action Transformers film series and the protagonist of his own film Bumblebee. He retains some elements from his Generation 1 design, such as the horn-like pieces in his head, which are articulated in the films. Bumblebee was given a different alternate mode from his original G1 incarnation; instead of a Volkswagen Beetle, he transforms into a rally yellow Chevrolet Camaro (the model year of which is upgraded in the first film). Director Michael Bay states in the special features of disc two of the first film's DVD release, that the change of Bumblebee's alternate mode was due to the fact that a Volkswagen Beetle reminded him of Herbie. Due to a battle injury, he is rendered effectively mute, and communicates through use of selected playback of radio and television signals. Though his original voice is restored at the end of the first Transformers film, he communicates solely through his radio in Revenge of the Fallen, Dark of the Moon and Age of Extinction. The biography for the Decepticon Hardtop figure states that he and Bumblebee are old rivals, and it was not Megatron who damaged Bumblebee's vocal processor, but a shot from Hardtop's gun. This is in almost direct opposition of the film's prequel.

Bumblebee is voiced by Mark Ryan in the films, but he mostly speaks with the radio, having had his voice processor damaged (through his actual voice squeaks and whines laboriously throughout the film series). He also speaks the quotes from various television shows and movies, in a way similar to Wreck-Gar from the 1986 film and the season three of the G1 cartoon series. Screenwriter Roberto Orci explained that he regained his voice through the regenerative laser that Ratchet fires at his neck as they meet, and it eventually works by the end of the film, in which he agreed that this was not made clear. Another possibility could be that his voice is healed by AllSpark, but was not mentioned in the film. The producers said that they made him as mute, to show that his bond with Sam went beyond words.

The vehicles used for Bumblebee, Ironhide, Jazz and Ratchet were put on display by General Motors at the 2007 Detroit River Walk Festival a little over a week before the U.S. release of the film.

In Hot Rod magazine's Nov. 2006 issue, Bumblebee was a feature article. Originally a worn-out 1969 Camaro, producers settled on a 1977 model. It is painted yellow with black stripes, primer and rust patches, riveted hood scoop, Cragar SS wheels up front, Eric Vaughn Real Wheels in the back, marine-grade vinyl seats, and even an eight-track player. The Camaro Concept model was built using a 2005 Holden Monaro by Saleen, with the body built from the same GM R&D molds that were used in the original 2006 Camaro Concept (the Monaro and Camaro share the same Zeta platform). Bumblebee is armed with a plasma cannon that is capable of selective fire. The 1977 Camaro movie vehicle was sold on eBay with a winning bid of U.S. $40,100.01.

As a tribute to the original form of Bumblebee, a yellow Volkswagen Beetle appears next to him at the car dealership. Bumblebee damages the Beetle in order to ensure that Sam purchases him. He also has a bee-shaped air freshener attached to his rear-view mirror with the words "Bee-otch". The air freshener was the subject of a lawsuit for $850,000 due to its alleged resemblance to another design.

Since his conversion from 1977 Camaro to 2006 Camaro Concept, Bumblebee's alternate mode continues to evolve throughout the film series.

Transformers (2007) 
In Transformers, Bumblebee appears as a dilapidated 1977 Chevrolet Camaro who is appointed as guardian for Sam Witwicky because he owns the glasses of his great-grandfather and explorer, Archibald Witwicky, containing the coordinates showing the location of the AllSpark. After Sam and his father buy it, he comes to their house, only to drive away from them to summon other Autobots. After Sam sees a police car transform into Decepticon Barricade, Bumblebee rescues him and his love crush, Mikaela Banes. After fighting with Barricade and Frenzy, he soon transforms into a 2006 Camaro concept. He soon meets the Autobots and their leader Optimus Prime, revealing their history and Bumblebee having the damaged voice. They retrieve the glasses, but are soon captured by a secret government organization Sector 7. After going to Hoover Dam, the secret Sector 7 base, Bumblebee is released and participates in the battle against Decepticons and their leader, Megatron. Following the battle, he stays with Sam and Mikaela as a guardian and friend and also having apparently repaired his voice (although he still uses the radio in the sequels, suggesting that his voice was not repaired fully).

Transformers: Revenge of the Fallen (2009) 
In Revenge of the Fallen, he sports a different set of alloy wheels (in the first two films they are actually hubcaps made from composite to look like a set of wheel-disc brakes) and a custom front bumper. It also comes with a unique Chevrolet logo design with red outlines in it, and redesigned foglights.

In the film, he is still a guardian to Sam Witwicky, but the latter says to him that Sam doesn't want protection and that he wants his own life and future. After the Decepticons lead by The Fallen put Sam in danger, Bumblebee is forced to rescue him. The revived Megatron and his comrades kill Optimus Prime; he, his comrade Autobots and human allies are trying to find a way to stop The Fallen. They soon discover the existence of Jetfire (a former Decepticon), who reveals the Matrix of Leadership, hidden in Egypt, as a key to revive Optimus Prime. After finding it, they rendezvous with other Autobots and the American NEST army to revive Optimus Prime. During the battle he kills Ravage. Optimus Prime is revived, then fights and kills The Fallen.

Transformers: Dark of the Moon (2011) 
For Dark of the Moon (now a Camaro SS), his color changes from yellow to amber with thicker black stripes that run across his hood, roof and trunk. In addition, he has dark-colored rims and side mirrors, as well as a rear spoiler. Also in the film, he has a stealth battle mode in which he can use his weapons in car mode without fully transforming and still being able to seat a driver and passengers.

In the film, Bumblebee no longer lives with Sam, and goes on the missions with the Autobots and human allies to find other Decepticons around the world. Bumblebee once again reunites with Sam after the latter comes with Carly and two Autobots, Wheelie and Brains, to the army base. When Sentinel Prime betrays the Autobots, he goes to battle against the Decepticons. This battle is stopped when Sentinel Prime (in alliance with Megatron) declares an ultimatum to the American government to banish the Autobots from Earth in exchange for peace. Apparently banished and killed by the Decepticons, the Autobots emerge alive and participate in the battle in Chicago, destroying the space bridge to bring Cybertron to Earth and killing Sentinel and Megatron.

Transformers: Age of Extinction (2014) 
In Age of Extinction, he transforms into a modified 1967 Chevrolet Camaro to avoid being hunted down by the mercenaries of Cemetery Wind. This design sports just a yellow front bumper and a rear spoiler and this vehicle is looking similar to the Dodge Hellcat.

As the Autobots storm the headquarters of KSI he scans a 2014 Camaro concept with an all-new look, with some major changes, now including a new front look with some advanced lamps including a dove black front bumper, black-long sideskirts, and new black rims. This time, there is only one stripe on the hood and a back license plate that says "900 STRA".

Five years after the battle in Chicago, Bumblebee and his surviving comrades are hiding in secrecy following the hunt by Cemetery Wind (a CIA rogue unit) and former Decepticon and bounty hunter Lockdown. He mostly doesn't speak in the film, relies on radio communication, but is hinted that his voice box is healing. Following the battle in Hong Kong, he assumes the leadership after Optimus Prime leaves in space to search the mysterious Creators.

Transformers: The Last Knight (2017) 
In The Last Knight, he leads Autobots and displays the ability to separate and reassemble himself during the combat, as shown in fight against TRF soldiers to protect Cade Yeager. When Bumblebee comes in London, England, he is revealed by Sir Edmund Burton that he helped the United States Army Air Force to fight against the Nazis in World War II and transformed into a Mercedes-Benz 770, although Bumblebee doesn't remember this event and his service, and it was retconned in his own movie. When Optimus Prime is brainwashed by Quintessa, Optimus fights on the ship with Bumblebee, the latter regaining his voice, enabling Optimus to remember him and his allies. Bumblebee participates in the final battle on Stonehenge to prevent Quintessa's plans to bring Cybertron on Earth, in addition to kill Unicron on that planet as well. He and Optimus kill Quintessa, although she is revealed to be alive at the end of the film.

Bumblebee (2018)
Bumblebee is the main protagonist of the spin-off film of the same name. Designated as B-127, he first appears in Cybertron with comrades, including Optimus Prime. B-127 is forced to retreat and travel to Earth by Prime's order after Decepticon battalion overwhelms them. Upon crash-landing on Earth in the forest, he is intercepted and hunted by Sector Seven forces, led by Jack Burns. Decepticon Seeker Blitzwing, arrives and captures B-127, demanding the location of his comrades. B-127 refuses and Blitzwing rips his voice synthesizer. Before he is executed, the B-127 jams Blitzwing's own missile and directs in his chest, killing him. With his memory cells severely damaged, B-127 scans a yellow Volkswagen Beetle before entering stasis.

Teenage girl Charlie Watson finds B-127 in junkyard, and attempting to repair the vehicle unknowingly activates homing signal. Initially scared when discovering the car as an alien robot, they soon develop a friendship. She calls him Bumblebee having found a hive while cleaning him up. Two Decepticons, Shatter and Dropkick, already nearby on a moon of Saturn track it to Earth.

Working with Sector Seven, Shatter and Dropkick discover and capture Bumblebee. Tortured for information about his comrades, they discover a message from Optimus Prime about retreating from Cybertron and going to Earth with other Autobots. They in turn send the message to Decepticons to enable the invasion on Earth. After leaving him for dead, Charlie uses Sector Seven's high voltage guns to revive him, restoring his memories. Trying to escape the Sector Seven forces as well, Bumblebee finally confronts and kills the two Decepticons and destroys the communication tower to prevent the message sent for other Decepticons and their invasion. Having saved Jack Burns from the Deceptions he stops chasing Bumblebee. After the battle, Bumblebee and Charlie say goodbye. Before driving off, he scans and transforms into a 1977 Camaro, and drive-off alongside the disguised Optimus Prime, to find more Autobots.

Transformers: Rise of the Beasts (2023) 
Bumblebee will return as one of the supporting protagonists in Transformers: Rise of the Beasts, which is set in 1994 and a sequel to Bumblebee.

Miscellaneous

Transformers: Cyber Missions 
Transformers: Cyber Missions is a CGI animated series created to supplement live-action series. In the series, Episode 1, Bumblebee and Ironhide are protecting NEST Command when two Decepticons, Soundwave and Bludgeon invade the area. Ironhide goes outside to deal with Bludgeon, while Soundwave ambushes Bumblebee from inside and is easily thrown down by him. He tries to fire a shot from his shoulder gun, but Soundwave redirects the acoustic energy back at him. Bumblebee deduces that he cannot deflect several rounds at once and begins rapidly firing, defeating him. Later in Episode 2, Bumblebee traps Soundwave in a magnetically sealed bubble.

Reception
Entertainment Weekly named Bumblebee as their seventh-favorite computer-generated character.

IDW Publishing
In Transformers: Defiance #1, back on ancient Cybertron, Bumblebee, and Cliffjumper are tasked to watch over the AllSpark at the temple at Simfur. In issue #3, Megatron learns that Optimus has broken into his room and sends Bumblebee, Camshaft, Cliffjumper, Jazz, Prowl, and Smokescreen to arrest Optimus Prime for treason. Optimus demands to speak directly to Megatron, but while en route to Megatron's location, they are ambushed by Barricade, Brawl, Crankcase, Frenzy, Starscream, Skywarp, and Thundercracker, under orders to kill them all. Smokescreen is able to cover Optimus and his group's retreat in the confusion of an explosion. In issue #4, Arcee, Bumblebee, Cliffjumper, Jazz, and Smokescreen ambush Ironhide, who they believed works for Megatron, but Ironhide instead joins Optimus Prime's Autobots. Arcee and Bumblebee later spy on the building of the Decepticon starship Nemesis.

The Transformers: Movie Prequel reveals that in the battle of Tyger Pax, Megatron's forces attack, searching for the All Spark. Bumblebee's squad (which includes Arcee) attempts to hold off the Decepticons, but are eventually overwhelmed. They are captured and tortured by Swindle, with Megatron intervening personally to torture Bumblebee for information. However, they refuse to speak long enough for Prime's secret plan to take effect—launching the AllSpark into outer space. Megatron attempts to pursue it, but Bumblebee stops him. An enraged Megatron rips Bumblebee's arms off and crushes his voice capacitor, promising to seize the AllSpark for himself eventually. Bumblebee recovers and is repaired, although his voice is damaged beyond repair. Bumblebee then volunteers to head into space to stop Megatron from acquiring the All Spark.

Eventually arriving on Mars in his protoform mode, Bumblebee then proceeds to Earth in 2003, his arrival tracked by the Hubble Space Telescope.

Upon landing in New York City, Bumblebee assumes the form of a beat-up Chevrolet Camaro, all the while avoiding the agents of the government organization known as Sector 7, who refer to him as NBE-2 (or Non-Biological Extraterrestrial 2). Bumblebee then downloads information on Captain Archibald Witwicky. Arriving at the asylum where he had once been incarcerated, he finds it now a dilapidated ruin. Damaged by a pursuing Barricade, he then finds AllSpark-like emissions somewhere in New Mexico—unaware it is a trap set by Sector 7. However, their plan to capture him is thwarted when Starscream, Barricade and Blackout arrive. As the Decepticons shoot Sector 7's trap to pieces, Bumblebee escapes—unaware the Decepticons had let him go so that they could follow him and see what he knew about the All Spark. He is last seen in the series heading for Tranquility, Nevada—home of Captain Witwicky's descendant Sam.

In the comic adaptation of the film, Bumblebee downloads information on the internet about the Concept Camaro car and took on its form instead of driving past in a tunnel, as seen in the film.

He also appears in the official movie sequel comic called The Reign of Starscream.

In Transformers: Alliance, the Autobots aid the human soldiers after the battle in Mission City, destroying the All Spark-powered machines that were created. After Ratchet finishes repairing Bumblebee's legs, a trailer is obtained for Optimus Prime to carry the remains of Jazz. The Autobots then leave Mission City before the Sector 7 personnel arrive to claim the remains of the Decepticons. About a month later, Epps and Lennox contact Optimus Prime, Ratchet and Ironhide about aiding them in escorting the remains of the Decepticons to the naval yard. Unknowingly they are spied on by Barricade, who transmits the information to Starscream.

Bumblebee appears in Transformers: Tales of the Fallen #1, where Barricade kidnaps Sam in order to flush out Bumblebee and learn where the AllSpark fragment is. Bumblebee saves Sam and fights Barricade, who escapes in the process.

Bumblebee appears in Transformers: Nefarious #1, set months after the events of the 2009 film. Bumblebee, Breakaway, Jolt, Knock Out and Dune Runner are sent to investigate spark fragments detected at Kingdom Petrochemicals. Arriving first, Breakaway is warned by Soundwave to leave, but unwilling to give in, the Autobot is swiftly defeated. Bumblebee and his team fire on Soundwave, who escapes.

The drone calling itself Brains runs into Bumblebee and Sam Witwicky in Philadelphia.

Titan Magazines
Note: Events occurring in the alternate universe where Megatron won the battle of Mission City are in italics.

In "Twilight's Last Gleaming Part 3", Bumblebee attempts to take on Megatron in the Sector 7 base. Meanwhile, Mikaela attempts to free Optimus Prime, but she is attacked by Frenzy.

Bumblebee appears in issue #17 of the Titan Transformers Magazine, in a story called "Return to Cybertron Part 1". In this story, he is among the Autobots that go to Cybertron.

Bumblebee returns in issue #22 of the Titan Transformers Magazine series in a story called "The Decepticon who Haunted Himself."

Books
Bumblebee also appears in the prequel novel Transformers: Ghosts of Yesterday. Here, it is revealed he could still communicate with the other Autobots via digital link. Bumblebee is part of Prime's Autobot team searching for the All Spark, and is described as one of the Autobots' best scouts. He is sent after the human vessel Ghost-1 (reverse-engineered from studies of Megatron) to make contact, but is ambushed and forced underground by Starscream. Encountering giant rock-chewing worms, he is saved by Optimus Prime. Heading into the atmosphere once again, he and Ratchet took on Barricade, but are unable to stop Starscream from destroying the human vessel.

Target Robo-Vision
According to his extended biography from the Target store-exclusive Robo-Vision web site, Hardtop came to Earth and discovered the Witwicky home before any of the other Decepticons, but was unable to attack the Witwickys because Bumblebee found him first and buried him under a hundred tons of rubble in the Rocky Mountains.

Video games
Bumblebee is a playable character, and is the most-used character in the Autobot campaign, where the character uses Bumblebee in nine missions in the Autobot campaign, out of the total 18. He is playable in both the old and new Camaro cars. Bumblebee also appears as a boss in the Decepticon campaign, with a radial blast attack.

Bumblebee is among the playable characters in the 2009 Revenge of the Fallen video game by Activision.

The film version of Bumblebee is playable in Hasbro's Net Jet Transformers fighting game Transformers Battle Universe. Although other playable Transformers in the game have several incarnations featured, no other versions of Bumblebee are playable.

Bumblebee is among the characters who appear in the TRANSFORMERS CYBERVERSE Battle Builder Game.

Other media
Bumblebee is one of the Autobots featured in Transformers: The Ride 3D at Universal Studios theme parks. In the ride, Bumblebee disembodies Ravage while Evac escapes from the Decepticon attack on N.E.S.T. headquarters. Towards the end of the ride, Bumblebee saves Evac from falling off a building after Evac kills Megatron with the AllSpark shard.

Bumblebee appears in the episode of Robot Chicken called "Tell My Mom", voiced by Seth Green. Sam Witwicky finds Bumblebee in Bobby Bolivia's used car lot and they go on an adventure, while Scooter is the only thing cheap in the lot. Bumblebee is portrayed as a fifth-generation Camaro.

During the final battle of the 2017 Power Rangers film, the Red Ranger, while piloting his T-Rex Zord, accidentally steps on a yellow Camaro of a similar model as the live-action Bumblebee. He throws the car at an army of Putties and shouts, "Sorry, Bumblebee!" as the car makes impact.

Transformers Animated 

Bumblebee appears in the Transformers Animated series in 2008 as a yellow hot hatch undercover police car (scanned from a vehicle driven by Detroit Police Captain Fanzone). The character of Bumblebee in Animated is described as a hot-headed racing young Autobot who likes video games, making him more akin to Armada Hot Shot than the original Bumblebee. He does however retain the traditional warm-heartedness and human-friendly attitude of the original due to his friendship with Sari Sumdac and Bulkhead. Although considered childish and self-centered by many of his fellow Autobots, Bumblebee shows a loyal and caring side for his friends, and can be considered protective of Sari Sumdac, to the extent of blocking shots, blasts, and missiles from harming her. This was first shown in "Transform and Roll Out! Part 3" when he deflected a shot from Starscream that was aimed at Sari. The blast rendered him unconscious until Sari healed him with her Key. He is the kid-friendly character of the show.

Bumblebee has a retractable face plate he uses when he goes into combat and a retractable weapon (called "energy stingers") in both hands. He can use the wheels on his feet in robot mode as motorized roller blades.

Animated series 
In the episode "Autoboot Camp", Bumblebee has flashbacks to his days as an Autobot trainee. During training, he met Bulkhead, Longarm, Ironhide, and Wasp. The group was under the command of Drill Sergeant Sentinel Minor, who gave Bumblebee his name (after calling him a "bumbler"). Bumblebee would often say or do the wrong thing, resulting in the entire platoon receiving Transformation push-ups as a result, which made him unpopular with Wasp and Ironhide. One day, Bumblebee heard someone communicating with Megatron. Believing the traitor to be Wasp, Bumblebee (with help from Longarm) discovered evidence in Wasp's locker. For discovering the traitor, Sentinel was prepared to give Bumblebee Elite Guard membership. However, Bumblebee gave up that chance by taking the rap for Bulkhead, who had previously knocked a building onto Sentinel, and was about to be removed from training, joining his new friend as a Space Bridge technician. Bulkhead and Bumblebee were assigned to a Space Bridge repair ship under the command of Optimus Prime, along with Ratchet. Both he and Bulkhead were the first to encounter Prowl before he joins their group.

In the series finale, during a rescue mission to save Arcee, who was on the moon, Bumblebee manages to settle the score with Shockwave before he and Bulkhead put him under arrest. After the Autobots learn of Prowl's ultimate sacrifice, they take the sparkless body of Prowl and the captured Megatron, Lugnut, and Shockwave to Cybertron. On their arrival home, they are greeted and cheered on by the other Autobots for their victory over the evil and malevolent leader of the Decepticons.

Fun Publications 
Bumblebee appeared in the 2008 BotCon voice actor play Bee in the City, voiced by Bumper Robinson. In this story Professor Sumdac attempted to create a teleportation system to get the Autobots to Cybertron, but an interaction with Sari's key ended up transporting Optimus Prime, Bumblebee and Sari to Transtech Cybertron, where they met Flareup and his friends were detained by Shockwave while he was deemed not a threat. Bumblebee teamed up with transformer named "Joe" to help him and Flareup get their friends. But after Joe exposed himself as a Megatron and uses Sari's key to create an army to begin a reign of terror, Bumblebee pointed out the world's bureaucratic nature that resulted in a mutiny. Afterwards the Autobots and Sari returned to their own dimension.

IDW Publishing
Set shortly after the events of "Total Meltdown" is the Transformers: Animated comic issue #2 by IDW Publishing. In it, Bumblebee and Prowl apprehend the Angry Archer as the villain attempts to steal money from a used car salesman. In doing so, they reveal the holographic trickery of the Detroit superhero known as The Wraith. With the secret of his power revealed, The Wraith loses much of the respect he used to command in Detroit. The Wraith attempts to stop Cyrus "The Colossus" Rhodes from escaping prison, but is unable to fool the villain now that the secret is public, forcing the Autobots to stop Rhodes and making The Wraith look foolish. The Wraith then attempts to discredit Bumblebee at a college football game by trapping the Autobot with a car boot and using his holograms to make a fake Bumblebee attack the stadium. Bumblebee eventually escapes and the other Autobots help capture The Wraith before having him placed in a mental institution.

Games
Bumblebee is one of the five playable characters in the 2008 Transformers Animated video game for the Nintendo DS.

Transformers: Timelines (Shattered Glass)

In the Transformers: Timelines series, Goldbug is an evil alternate reality version of Bumblebee.

According to his official biography, Goldbug was once a young drifter known as Bumblebee. He survived on the streets of Polyhex with no real purpose. He became skilled at sneaking around, stealing, eavesdropping and blackmailing. He eagerly joined the Autobots in hopes of finding a place to belong and where his unsavory activities would be tolerated. When the war began, Bumblebee showed extreme bravery in battle and often sought ways to be noticed by command. In time, he worked his way up the ranks of the Autobots and when the Autobot Seeker Drench was destroyed, Bumblebee was offered an upgraded form and a new identity as Goldbug, to take his place.

Goldbug is paranoid that one of his fellow Autobots will betray him and try to take his place, as he did to his former superiors.

Reception
The Botcon 2008 set was chosen as the "Action Figure Digest Hot Pick."

Fun Publications
Goldbug appears in the 2008 April Fool's comic Shattered Expectations by Fun Publications.

Goldbug appears as a member of Optimus Prime's forces in the Transformers: Timelines story "Shattered Glass." Goldbug and Blurr report to Optimus Prime the rumors that Megatron is planning an attack. When the Decepticons attack the Ark launch site Blurr, Goldbug and Rodimus compete for who could destroy the most Decepticons, but thanks to Cliffjumper the Decepticon attack is successful.

Goldbug appears in the fiction Dungeons & Dinobots, a text-based story. He is among the Autobots who attack the Decepticons at the Arch-Ayr fuel dump. He is later sent to capture rogue Dinobots for the Autobots. He is part of the group that captures Swoop.

In Do Over Goldbug conspires with Rodimus to take over the Autobots. Together they steal the Ark, evicting any crew members who are loyal to Optimus Prime before blasting off to Earth. The Ark then crashes on Earth.

Goldbug is among the Autobots brought back online. He initially commands a small group of Autobots who find Rodimus. After losing a fight with Rodimus for leadership Goldbug participates in the attack on Burpleson Air Force Base.

Toys

 Timelines Deluxe Goldbug (2008)
Goldbug is a remold of Cybertron Hot Shot. He is redecoed yellow-and-black, and has a blue head remolded to look like the Generation 1 Goldbug toy. This gives the toy a scale of 1:32.

Aligned continuity

Bumblebee is one of the main group of Autobots in the 2010 computer-animated series Transformers: Prime. Bumblebee is younger than most of the Autobots, and lost his voice box when he was captured by Megatron during the Great War. Bumblebee remains more playful than the other Autobots despite his lack of voice, and has come to rely on his speed as his most valuable asset in battle. Bumblebee is extremely similar to his movie counterpart, sharing the similar vehicle and robot forms, the same lack of voice, and his close relationship to a human boy. It is also revealed in the series finale episode "Deadlock" that Bumblebee's mouth was covered by a face plate vaguely resembling that of Optimus Prime's that helped him to create the alternative beeping noises he uses as his main form of communication throughout the series. Later in the series he changes his color scheme by reversing the colors, resembling Bumblebee's original 1977 paint scheme in the 2014 Age of Extinction film.

Bumblebee returns as the central protagonist of the sequel series Transformers: Robots in Disguise, with Will Friedle reprising his role. Set five years after the events of Prime, Bumblebee becomes the leader of a group of Autobots that end up on Earth to fight a generation of Decepticons who have re-emerge on the planet after a prison ship crash, being previously put in stasis before the war was over. In later seasons this expands to battling old enemies from Prime, Stunticons, and the corruption of Cybertron itself. 
A constant running gag throughout the first season is Bumblebee's inability to come up with a decent command for his team to mobilize, in the vein of Optimus Prime's famous order to "roll out". Bumblebee retains a similar vehicle mode as he did in Prime, now a 1992 Chevrolet Camaro. However, his robot mode has gone through a serious redesign. Notably retaking his original primarily yellow color scheme rather than the dominantly black one he took at the end of Prime.

Books
Bumblebee appears in the novels Transformers: Exodus and Transformers: Exiles.

Bumblebee losing his voice was the focus of the short story "Bumblebee at Tyger Pax" By Alex Irvine.

Video games
Bumblebee appears as a playable character in the 2010 video game Transformers: War for Cybertron. In the Autobot campaign, he is first seen racing across the war-torn streets of Iacon in search of Optimus. Upon rendezvousing with Optimus, he relays the message of Zeta Prime's death at the hands of Megatron; after which, he joins Optimus and Ratchet in their resistance against the Decepticons on the planet. He later appears in the final level of the game, where Bumblebee teams up with Optimus and Ironhide to prevent the Decepticon Titan, Trypticon from destroying Iacon.

In Transformers: Fall of Cybertron, the sequel to War for Cybertron, players start as Bumblebee in the first level. He appears throughout the game as well.

Animated series
With the exception of Optimus Prime, Bumblebee is the only character to appear in all three TV shows set within the Aligned continuity, including Transformers: Rescue Bots and Transformers: Robots in Disguise. Frank Welker recorded actual words written for Bumblebee which were later replaced with sound effects. When Bumblebee regains his voice, it's provided by actor Will Friedle.

Transformers: Prime (2010-2013)
Bumblebee appears in the pilot episode of the series responding too late to a call for help from Cliffjumper, who is captured by the Decepticons and killed. Bumblebee soon is assigned to be Raf Esquivel's guardian, having grown close to the boy as he understands his language of beeps. In the "Operation: Bumblebee" two-parter, Bumblebee lost his transformation cog and its ability to have him transform before eventually retrieving the cog from human terrorist group M.E.C.H. and Starscream.

Bumblebee's goal in the series is to be promoted to warrior class, as he first states in "Masters & Students". Optimus does not believe him to be worthy of promotion at such a young age. Nevertheless, Bumblebee shows he is still a capable warrior, since he is able to fight the likes of Breakdown and Shockwave. When questioned by Smokescreen in "Project Predacon", Bumblebee admits he is holding back so that he can one day be promoted to warrior class on Cybertron.

In "Deadlock", during the final battle aboard the Nemesis, Bumblebee tries to give Optimus Prime the Star Saber for him to fight Megatron, but is killed by the Decepticon. However, Bumblebee fell into the ship's Omega Lock and exposure to the Cyber Matter powering it both revived him and restored his voice. As Megatron prepared to finish Optimus, Bumblebee used the Star Saber to stab him in his spark, killing him. Afterwards, once the Omega Lock restored Cybertron, Bumblebee gives Raf a goodbye before leaving for his home world where he is finally promoted to warrior class during the series finale Predacons Rising. However, things quickly turn for the worse when Unicron appears on Cybertron in Megatron's body, and two new Predacons are cloned by Shockwave. With Optimus on a mission to retrieve the AllSpark, and Ultra Magnus having been severely wounded by the new Predacons, Bumblebee becomes Autobot leader at Ratchet's encouragement as he leads them, the newly defected Knock Out and the three Predacons in making a stand against Unicron's undead Predacon army at the Well of All Sparks, buying enough time for Optimus to return to defeat Unicron. Optimus reveals that he must sacrifice himself to restore the AllSpark to Cybertron's core, and does not pass on leadership to any one person present, stating that leadership will now be earned through actions. Bumblebee promises to keep the peace on Cybertron to Optimus, implying Bumblebee to be the new leader of the Autobots, and by extension, Cybertron's new age.

Transformers: Robots in Disguise (2015-2017)

Bumblebee appears as the main protagonist of the sequel series Transformers: Robots in Disguise, with Will Friedle reprising his role. In the series, Bumblebee is called to Earth when a new generation of Decepticons re-emerges on the planet. After receiving a vision from Optimus Prime, Bumblebee travels to Earth via a spacebridge and discovers that a ship full of Decepticon criminals has crashed on Earth and its inmates have escaped. Initially believing that Optimus' mission is intended for him alone, Bumblebee ends up with a team of ragtag Autobots, including a rebel bad boy bot named Sideswipe, a hyper active Mini-Con named Fixit, the bombastic ex-Decepticon and Dinobot Grimlock, and a female Elite Guard cadet named Strongarm, in order to combat the Decepticons. After befriending humans Denny Clay and his son Russell and fighting the Chompazoid Underbite, the group is greeted by the inexplicably corporeal Optimus. Unable to explain his return, Optimus expresses his confidence in Bumblebee and his new team before departing.

While leading the team, to recapture the escaped Decipticons, they come across Steeljaw, an escaped convict who has his own plan to lead the other escaped convicts. The Autobots would later receive a visit from Bumblebee's old comrade Jazz, who informed Bumblebee that his actions in departing Cybertron had angered the high council. After helping apprehend a fugitive named Ped, Jazz volunteered to return to Cybertron and inform the council of what had taken place. The team then received another group of Cybertronian visitors, in the form of Autobot bounty hunter Drift, Decepticon bounty hunter Fracture, and their Mini-Con teammates. Both Cybertronians arrived to collect a bounty placed on Bumblebee by the High Council for his actions, but Drift was convinced of Bumblebee's nobility after Bee saved his life. The team managed to defeat Fracture, and though his ship was lost they gained the use of his ground bridge.

After all of them but Grimlock and Fixit were given Decepticon Hunters, Bee and his team would then be forced to deal with Steeljaw's gang again—now including Thunderhoof, Underbite, and Fracture and his Mini-Cons—as both pursued the Decepticon fugitive Clampdown. Bee's team managed to capture all the Decepticons, but were forced to let them escape when Steeljaw broke free and set an unmanned garbage barge loose in the path of a riverboat.

Drift and his Mini-Cons would later return to Earth and subsequently join the team. The team continued to capture escaped convicts. Bumblebee was once again contacted by Optimus with further warnings, shortly before Steeljaw and his pack managed to briefly seize the scrapyard; however, the Autobots managed to recover their base. The team soon gained another new ally in the form of the Primus-chosen female Autobot warrior Windblade, who aided the team in securing the fugitives Razorpaw and Zizza before departing.

Unfortunately for Bumblebee and his team, the threat that Optimus had warned them of soon revealed itself as Megatronus, a disgraced member of the Thirteen. Having struck a deal with Steeljaw's pack, Megatronus instructed them to construct several devices he needed, which they did after capturing Strongarm, Sideswipe, and the returning Windblade. Bumblebee led the remainder of his team against them, only for Optimus arrive shortly before Megatronus made his appearance. Deferring to his former commander, Bumblebee became more concerned with Optimus' well-being and leadership than trusting in his own previous experiences. Fortunately, his team rallied behind him and gave him the courage to stand firm, which enabled them to capture Steeljaw's Pack after the would-be Decepticon tyrant was ejected from the battle by Megatronus. The Autobots then fought to prevent Megatronus from destroying both Earth and Cybertron, and managed it after discovering the latent powers of Bumblebee, Sideswipe, and Strongarm's Decepticon Hunters used in tandem and copying the sword form of Optimus' Prime Decepticon Hunter. With Megatronus defeated and possibly eliminated, the Autobots departed for home, with Bumblebee at last finding his rallying cry: "Rev up and roll out!"

With Megatronus defeated and most of the Pack apprehended, Bumblebee questioned whether his fellow Autobots wished to remain with him on Earth. To a one they agreed, with Windblade and Optimus formally joining the team, though Optimus did so as Bumblebee's equal rather than his superior. Turning their attention to Decepticon fugitives still scattered around the globe, Bumblebee decided to split his team by dispatching Drift, his Mini-Cons, and Windblade to seek out Decepticons in other locations while the rest of the team remained at the scrapyard. At their own insistence Optimus and Sideswipe joined the team, which ended up stranded in the Arctic after Optimus' altered state damaged their Groundbridge. Unfortunately, the remainder of the team soon had to deal with another problem: Overload, a Decepticon who had previously infiltrated the Autobot ranks and caused Bumblebee to sustain serious injuries, greatly embittering the former scout.

Bumblebee became consumed with bringing Overload in, even after the Mini-Con fugitives Backtrack and Ransack were freed during their initial battle; the two Mini-Cons subsequently joined forces with Overload. Bee would continue to carry out his missions, though once he gained the ability to combine with his teammates, He became edgier on ethics during the Stunticon battles. He eventually realized that he tweaked a perfect formula for the worst, and resumed his usual command style for the rest of the show.

Transformers: Rescue Bots
Bumblebee appears in the episode "Bumblebee to the Rescue", where he helps the Rescue Bots, and their human partners investigate a fallen meteor. Optimus Prime briefly assigns Bumblebee to observe how the Rescue Bots and the Burns family work together. Cody and the rest of the Burns family are unable to understand Bumblebee and requires one of the Rescue Bots to translate. The Rescue Bot Blades also happens to be a big fan of Bumblebee (who is said to be a legendary scout and war hero by the Rescue Bots). When Heatwave, Boulder, and Chase are infected by a substance contained in the meteor, Bumblebee, Blades, and the Burns family work together to destroy the meteor and obtain a sample in a hope to find a cure. Bumblebee and Blades successfully destroy the meteor and retrieve the sample, but at the cost of being infected as well, but thankfully the Burnses use an analysis of the meteor sample Bumblebee found, They are able to find a cure in the Autobots database, curing Bumblebee and the Rescue Bots. At the end of the episode, Cody is revealed to have learned how to understand Bumblebee. Before leaving, Bumblebee asks the Burnses (with Cody acting as interpreter) if they can take a picture of him and Blades.

Bumblebee returns with Optimus Prime in "It's a Bot Time" and "Bots to the Future", where they go back in time to save the Rescue Bots from Dr. Morocco. They return to an alternate present with Dr. Morocco ruling Griffin Rock. They fight Morbots, while the Rescue Bots go into the city. They find out they left Dilther behind, which is how the Morbot army exists. They go back in time to take him back to the present, which is then changed back to the regular timeline. Bumblebee later returned in "Odd Bot Out", where he was sent to search for a missing Cybertronian artifact on Griffin Rock while Optimus searched the nearby seafloor. To the dismay of his biggest fan Blades, Bumblebee teamed up with Dani, who was temporarily unable to pilot Blades due to her pilot's license expiring.

He returned in the season 4 episode "Uninvited Guest", making a crash landing at the training center and helping contain a stowaway Energon Eater. Will Friedle reprised his role for the final time here, co-starring with his best friend Jason Marsden.

Rescue Bots Academy saw Bumblebee receive multiple mentions and pictorial cameos, until he was brought as a guest teacher in the episode "Bee Prepared", to the excitement of all the recruits, especially Wedge. Friedle had been dropped as Bumblebee's voice actor for the series due to the series going non-union, having been replaced by Jeremy Levy, who uses an identical voice used for Cyberverse Bumblebee.

Kre-O Transformers

Bumblebee is an Autobot warrior, and is based on the Generation 1 version of the character.

Non-Fictional biography

Animated series
Kreon Bumblebee appeared in the animated shorts "Last Bot Standing", "Bot Stars", "My Ride is Better Than Your Ride", "The Big Race", "A Gift for Megatron", "Megatron's Revenge", and "Quest for Energon, Part 1".

Games
Kre-O Bumblebee appears in the flash video game Kre-O Transformers Konquest. In this game Kreon Optimus Prime attempts to avoid bombs and collect parts to rebuild Kre-O Ratchet, Mirage, Prowl, and Bumblebee.

Angry Birds Transformers
In the tenth installment of the Angry Birds series, Angry Birds Transformers, Bumblebee appears. Here he is portrayed by Chuck (better known as Yellow Bird). Bumblebee/Chuck has four variations, one which is yellow with black stripes based on his pre-Age of Extinction look, one that is based on his Age of Extinction appearance, a similar one with blue highlights, meant to resemble Energon, and one inspired by the Bumblebee film. The first three resemble a Dodge Challenger in vehicle mode, while the fourth resembles a Volkswagen Beetle.

Transformers: Cyberverse

Bumblebee is one of the main characters of Transformers: Cyberverse as well as the initial protagonist for seasons 1 and 2 before sharing the role with Optimus Prime and Cheetor for season 2 and Hot Rod for season 3's take on the Quintesson story arc.

See also
Lists of Transformers characters
Sakura Kasugano
Transformers (sculptures), 10-foot (3 m) tall sculptures of Bumblebee and Optimus Prime in Washington, D.C.

References

External links

 G1 Bumblebee on the Transformers Wiki

3H Enterprises characters
Action film characters
Chevrolet Camaro
Fictional characters who can move at superhuman speeds
Fictional motorcycles
Fictional mute characters
Fictional secret agents and spies
Fictional robots
Fun Publications characters
Male characters in animated series
Male characters in film
Robot characters in video games
Transformers characters
Television characters introduced in 1984
Volkswagen Beetle

sv:Figurer i Transformers#Bumblebee